Buckshaw Village (often shortened to Buckshaw) is a 21st-century residential and industrial area between the towns of Chorley and Leyland in Lancashire, England, developed on the site of the former Royal Ordnance Factory (ROF) Chorley. It had a population of 4,000. It is divided between the civil parishes of Euxton (south)  and Whittle-le-Woods (north east) in Chorley, with the north western part being in Leyland unparished area in South Ribble district. 

The new development covers several square miles mainly consisting of the part of Euxton known as Buckshaw, which was requisitioned by the War Office in the 1930s. It is described by developers Redrow plc as "One of the largest brownfield schemes of its kind throughout Europe";  they report that over 3,000 homes have been built and 10,000 jobs created.

Sustainability
The area is being developed in line with sustainable development principles and aims to transform a brownfield former munitions site. All landscaping is designed so that no earth is transported off-site with the stripped top soil now present in mounds dotted around the village. A trial scheme is in progress which uses recycled garden waste combined with sandy clay (loam) to produce compost. The compost is then spread over the mounds to produce woodland areas and green public spaces.

The transport strategy also incorporates sustainable principles with cycle lanes and public transport included in the masterplan.  Improvements to the neighbouring M6 and M61 junctions have also been made. Public transport is also catered for by the new railway station that has been built.

Designing for storm water drainage run-off uses sustainable urban drainage systems (SUDS), which ensure no discharge leaves the site into neighbouring water courses. Measures include roadside verge soakaways and the use of retention ponds, which are fully integrated into the landscaping.

Amenities include a village centre (developed by Eden Park Developments Ltd) with shops and all-weather sports pitches, one of the five primary schools in Euxton  and a medical centre. Planning permission was approved in February 2007 for a community centre which also provides office facilities for the local police.

Industry / commerce

Two halves of the development are separated by a major new road called Central Avenue. To the west is an industrial and commercial centre known as Matrix Business Park. Planning permission was granted in January 2007 for Buckshaw Village's first pub. The Pub which is owned and run by Marston's was named the Bobbin Mill, and is situated in Plot 1000B of Matrix Park, which opened on 7 April 2008.

Another major road, Buckshaw Avenue has been built running west–east through Buckshaw Village connecting Central Avenue to the A6. Buckshaw Avenue opened to the public in May 2007.

Revolution Park
Plans were announced in February 2006 for a new industrial development called Revolution Park, by property developers HelioSlough (a joint venture between Helios Properties PLC and Slough Estates). The  site is accessed via Buckshaw Avenue and is situated in the south-east portion of the Buckshaw Village site. This is adjacent to the  plot occupied by Lex Auto Logistics' new distribution centre, completed in late 2006.

Buckshaw Link
Another commercial development by Helioslough, called Buckshaw Link, had been built and completed by late 2010 and all the businesses were in place by 2011. The industrial estate is situated on land to the west of Revolution Park.

Multipart Solutions Limited the successor to Chorley's Leyland Trucks unit moved to a new purpose built site on Buckshaw in 2007.

Badger Office Supplies, the largest supplier of remanufactured ink and 12th fastest growing company in the United Kingdom, is situated near the Tesco supermarket. Merlin Cycles are one of the UK's longest established online bike shops and mail order specialists. They are based in unit A1, Ordnance Road.

Housing

Up to 2000 new housing units are being built by various housebuilders, including Redrow, Barratt Homes, Persimmon, and Rowland Homes. The homes are mainly targeted at the family market but many of the new homes are also specifically aimed at first-time buyers with measures such as shared ownership schemes. Additionally, a joint venture between the Hica Group and Caddick Group sees the construction of a new retirement village designed to accommodate 200 homes aimed at over 55's. This will be situated to the west of Central Avenue adjacent to BAE Systems.

There is also an eco-friendly village built in conjunction with scientists from University of Manchester, who are testing various experimental and environmentally friendly principles. The homes will use a variety of energy sources, from geothermal and solar power to wind energy. The scheme is now a show village after opening on 25 May 2006.

This scheme was extended into a new development by Persimmon Homes into the Water's Edge development, which features an extension to the local Trinity Church of England/Methodist Primary School. The homes also offer different ways of generating power, such as the solar panels seen on many houses.

Heritage

There are two listed buildings in this area that the ROF had a duty of care over. The smaller of these is Worden Old Hall, a grade II* listed building from the late sixteenth and early seventeenth century which was the ancestral seat of the Farrington family of Worden and not part of Euxton, but rather part of South Ribble. It had fallen into disrepair to the extent that it appeared on English Heritage's Buildings At Risk register, but was redeveloped by the Maysand Group over three years, finishing in August 2006

The other building is probably the oldest intact building in Euxton, namely Buckshaw Hall, which was built in the 1650s for the Robinson family, land owners from Chorley. 

Both buildings are located not far from the area known as Upper Buckshaw.

Transport

Road connections nearby include the motorways M6 and M61, as well as the A6 and A49 roads.

Buckshaw Parkway railway station is one of Euxton's two railway stations (the other being Euxton Balshaw Lane railway station); it opened on 3 October 2011. The railway station is situated opposite Runshaw College, and provides 3tph south to Hazel Grove and Manchester Airport or 3tph north to Blackpool North through Preston.

Bus services run by Stagecoach Merseyside & South Lancashire offer connections to Chorley, Leyland and Preston. Route 109 connects Chorley to Preston and was a joint venture run by John Fishwick until the company ceased trading in October 2015; service 109A connects Chorley to Leyland via Astley Village, Chorley Hospital and Buckshaw Village during the daytime every 30 minutes.

The developers of Buckshaw Village have incorporated an extensive cycle network into the masterplan and were awarded the 2005 Sustrans National Cycle Network Award for Excellence for Developer Infrastructure. Buckshaw Village forms part of the National Cycle Route 55 of the National Cycle Network.

Divisions

Buckshaw Village is split with sections in three Parish and Borough boundaries. Matrix Park and much of the north west side of the village is in Leyland (i.e. South Ribble Borough Council) with a few homes on the Eastern side when built falling within the Whittle-le-Woods parish boundary. The majority of the homes will be in the parish of Euxton as part of the Astley & Buckshaw Borough Ward. Both Euxton and Whittle-le-Woods Parish Councils fall within Chorley Borough Council.

It is understood Chorley borough will adopt all of Buckshaw Village within its boundaries once the development is complete and likely incorporate all of it into Euxton Parish Council where the majority of the area historically lies.

References

Villages in Lancashire
Geography of Chorley
Geography of South Ribble
New towns in England